Wen Zhang (born 26 June 1984) is a Chinese actor. He graduated from the Central Academy of Drama in 2006. Wen ranked 58th on Forbes China Celebrity 100 list in 2013, and 45th in 2014.

Career

Rising popularity
Wen first became known for his role in the youth drama Romantic Life.

Wen rose to fame for his role in the youth television series Struggle (2007). Based on the popular novel by Shi Kang, Struggle gained unexpected acclaim and was seen as a breakthrough in Chinese TV production as it broke from the usual Chinese TV series focusing in traditional legends and series.

Another notable series Wen starred in is Dwelling Narrowness (2009). The series, which focuses on rising property prices in China and the impact it has on youths and their ambitions, was a major hit with the audiences and sparked a discussion among youths online. The same year, he made his film debut in A Tale of Two Donkeys (directed by Li Dawei), a black comedy film set in the Cultural Revolution. Wen won the Best New Actor award at the China Movie Channel Media Awards for his performance.

Mainstream success
Wen had his first major role on the screen in Xue Xiaolu's literary film, Ocean Heaven (2010), playing a 21-year-old autistic man whose only happiness is swimming. Wen was initially rejected by the producers, as he did not fit their requirements; and this prompted him to master four kinds of living strokes in one week. After he successfully got the role, Wen underwent arduous training - which involves swimming 5000 m per day and a 180-day's living with a group of autistic people, which Wen says helped him get closer to their inner mind. Wen's efforts paid off to overwhelming positive reviews from critics, and he clinched the Best Actor award at the China Movie Channel Media Awards. The same year, Wen won the Best Actor award at the Sichuan Television Festival and Audience's Choice for Actor at the Golden Eagle Awards for his role as a war-time hero in Snow Leopard.

In 2011, Wen starred in the romantic comedy Love is Not Blind alongside Bai Baihe. The low-budget film became a surprise hit and ended up grossing over 350 million yuan at the Chinese box office. Wen won the Best Actor award at the Hundred Flowers Award for his performance. The same year, Wen won the Best Actor award at the China TV Drama Awards for his performance in Naked Wedding. The series, which explores the struggles a China couple faces when they marry for love with no house, substantial savings, or elaborate ceremonies, struck a chord with Chinese youths and become a major hit.

In 2013, he starred as Tang Sanzang in Stephen Chow's fantasy blockbuster Journey to the West: Conquering the Demons, which broke records to become the highest grossing Chinese movie then. He also starred in action comedy Badges of Fury alongside Jet Li. The same year, Wen launched his directorial debut, Little Daddy on the small screen; which stars himself as the lead actor. He received the award for Best TV Series for the production, and the Best TV Actor award at the LETV Awards.

Post-scandal and successful comeback
Wen directed his first film, When Larry Met Mary which was released in 2016. However, despite positive reviews, the film failed to do well at the box office. Wen received the Best Directorial Debut award at the Golden Rooster Awards.

The same year, Wen made a successful comeback in 2016 with the hit television series, Young Marshal, a biopic based on the life of war hero Zhang Xueliang.

Personal life
Wen married Chinese actress Ma Yili, who is eight years older, and they have a two-year-old daughter. They first met while appearing in a Chinese historical television drama The Jinyiwei Guard. When they filmed Struggle together, they became lovers. However, in 2014, Wen was exposed by the media to be involved in an affair with Yao Di, a Chinese actress who starred with Wen in the 2011 television series Naked Marriage. His affair attracted widespread discussion on Sina Weibo with over millions of comments. On 28 July 2019, they announced their divorce on Sina Weibo.

Filmography

Film

Television series

Awards and nominations

References 

Living people
1984 births
Chinese male stage actors
Male actors from Xi'an
Chinese male film actors
Chinese male television actors
Central Academy of Drama alumni
21st-century Chinese male actors